Pennsylvania Route 191 (PA 191) is a -long state highway in the U.S. state of Pennsylvania. The route, a major non-freeway corridor connecting the Lehigh Valley to the Pocono Mountains in eastern Pennsylvania, is designated from U.S. Route 22 (US 22) in Brodhead near the city of Bethlehem to the New York state line over the Delaware River at Hancock, New York.

Commissioned on April 17, 1961, the route replaced the PA 12 and PA 90 numbers that were in place from the late 1920s to the 1960s. From 1961 to 1976, PA 191 was routed south of US 22 through Bethlehem and terminated at PA 309 in Center Valley. PA 378 replaced the designation from Center Valley to the Lehigh River crossing in Bethlehem.

Route description

Northampton County

PA 191 begins along Nazareth Pike at an interchange with the US 22 freeway in Bethlehem Township, Northampton County in the Lehigh Valley. South of US 22, Nazareth Pike continues as State Route 3015, an unsigned quadrant route, to the city of Bethlehem, where it becomes Linden Street. From the interchange, PA 191 heads north-northeast along two-lane undivided Nazareth Pike and runs through the community of Brodhead, passing businesses a short distance to the east of Monocacy Creek. The road crosses into Lower Nazareth Township and crosses the creek twice as it passes more commercial development with some woods and homes, passing through the community of Hecktown. In the community of Newburg, the route intersects the eastern terminus of PA 946 and heads through farmland with some residences. PA 191 passes to the east of the former Nazareth Speedway and heads past businesses before reaching an intersection with PA 248 on the southern border of the borough of Nazareth. At this point, PA 191 turns east for a concurrency with PA 248 on Easton Road, forming the border between Nazareth to the north and Lower Nazareth Township to the south before fully entering Nazareth. PA 191 splits from PA 248 by turning north onto South Broad Street and crossing Norfolk Southern's Cement Secondary before continuing into residential areas. The route heads into the downtown area of Nazareth, where it turns east onto East Center Street. PA 191 heads past more homes, turning north onto North New Street. The road leaves Nazareth for Upper Nazareth Township and curves to the east-northeast as East Lawn Road, passing residences and businesses in the community of Eastlawn Gardens. The route heads into industrial areas and passes north of a quarry, crossing a Norfolk Southern railroad spur. PA 191 widens into a four-lane divided highway and passes through a corner of Palmer Township before crossing the Bushkill Creek into the borough of Stockertown as Industrial Boulevard, crossing a Norfolk Southern railroad spur and passing near more commercial development and industry before reaching an interchange with the PA 33 freeway.

Past this interchange, the route heads northeast past more commercial development as a four-lane undivided road before crossing the Stockertown Rails-to-Trails into residential areas. PA 191 turns northwest onto two-lane undivided Main Street and is lined with homes. The route leaves Stockertown for Plainfield Township, intersecting the Stockertown Rails-to-Trails and the Plainfield Township Trail paths, and turns north-northeast onto Bangor Road at the Sullivan Trail intersection. The road passes near homes and commercial development with some farm fields before it comes to the community of Edelman, where it crosses over the Little Bushkill Creek and the Plainfield Township Trail. PA 191 curves northeast and heads through rolling farmland with some woodland and residences. The route turns east before it enters Washington Township and curves back to the northeast, continuing through more rural areas with some development as Washington Boulevard. The road reaches the community of Ackermanville and turns east, passing homes. PA 191 turns to the north and continues through wooded residential areas. The route turns northeast before curving north and entering the borough of Bangor, where it comes South 1st Street and is lined with homes and some businesses. PA 191 heads into the downtown area of Bangor and comes to an intersection with PA 512, where the name changes to North 1st Street. From here, the road continues through developed areas, curving to the north-northwest. The route runs through woodland and enters the borough of Roseto, where it becomes Roseto Avenue and heads north, lined with homes and a few businesses. PA 191 leaves Roseto for Washington Township and heads north-northeast through woods before curving north and crossing into Upper Mount Bethel Township, where the name becomes Valley View Drive. The road heads through woodland with some development before heading northeast to ascend forested Blue Mountain.

Monroe and Pike counties

Upon reaching the summit of Blue Mountain, PA 191 enters Stroud Township in Monroe County and heads into the Pocono Mountains region of Pennsylvania. The road becomes Godfrey Ridge Road and crosses the Appalachian Trail before it makes a hairpin turn to the west to begin descending the mountain. The route turns north and winds through forested areas at the base of the mountain. PA 191 heads north along a winding path through more wooded areas with some fields and homes before it enters the borough of Stroudsburg and comes to an intersection with PA 611. Past this intersection, the route continues north along Broad Street through residential areas, coming to a partial interchange with I-80/US 209 with access to and from the westbound lanes of I-80/US 209; access to and from the eastbound lanes is provided by PA 611. Following this interchange, the road crosses McMichael Creek and reaches an intersection with US 209 Bus. in the downtown area of Stroudsburg, with PA 191 briefly splitting into a one-way pair, with the northbound direction following northbound US 209 Bus. on Main Street, North 4th Street, and southbound US 209 Bus. on  McConnell Street, while the southbound direction follows South 5th Street. After intersecting US 209 Bus., PA 191 continues north along North 5th Street, winding through residential areas. The road turns northwest and leaves Stroudsburg for Stroud Township, passing businesses before running past homes. The road curves north and runs through wooded areas with some development, with the Brodhead Creek Trail and the Brodhead Creek becoming parallel to the east of the road. The route turns northwest alongside the trail and the creek before it curves northeast and comes to a bridge over the Brodhead Creek and a Delaware-Lackawanna Railroad line, coming to an intersection with PA 447. At this point, PA 191 becomes concurrent with PA 447 and the two routes head northwest on Paradise Trail, running through forests with some development, with the creek and railroad tracks parallel to the west. The road heads through mountainous areas and reaches the community of Analomink, turning east before curving north as an unnamed road. The roadway continues through forests to the east of the Brodhead Creek, with PA 447 splitting to the north.

From here, PA 191 crosses Brodhead Creek and heads northwest through forested areas to the northeast of the parallel Paradise Creek. The road passes under the Delaware-Lackawanna Railroad line and enters Pocono Township, curving north and running between the creek and the railroad tracks. The route heads into Paradise Township and continues through mountainous areas. PA 191 crosses the Paradise Creek and comes to an intersection with the northern terminus of PA 715 in the community of Henryville. The road crosses the creek again in the community of Parkside and continues northwest through forests with some homes. In the community of Paradise Valley, PA 191 reaches a junction with the eastern terminus of PA 940 and turns northeast. The route runs through more woodland and turns northwest, passing near a forested residential development and reaching an intersection with PA 390. At this point, PA 390 heads north concurrent with PA 191, running through more dense forests with some development and crossing into Barrett Township. The road turns north-northeast and passes over a Delaware-Lackawanna Railroad line before heading through the community of Cresco. The two routes continue into the residential and commercial community of Mountainhome, where PA 390 splits to the northeast and PA 191 continues north. The route passes wooded areas of residences before turning northwest and winding through dense forests. The road turns north and west before it crosses into Coolbaugh Township, where it heads northwest before a turn to the north. PA 191 enters Greene Township in Pike County and becomes La Anna Road, heading north-northeast through more forests before curving to the northwest and passing through the community of La Anna.

Wayne County
PA 191 crosses the Wallenpaupack Creek into Dreher Township in Wayne County and heads into the upper regions of the Pocono Mountains, becoming South Sterling Road and soon reaching an intersection with the northern terminus of PA 423. From here, the road turns north into forested areas to the west of the Wallenpaupack Creek, turning east and then north as it passes through the community of South Sterling. The route continues north and passes through Haags Mill, coming to a junction with PA 507. Here, PA 507 turns north to form a concurrency with PA 191, heading north on Main Street through wooded areas with some fields and homes to the west of creek. The road curves to the north-northeast and intersects the northern terminus of PA 447 in Newfoundland. The two routes pass through rural residential and commercial development before PA 507 splits to the northeast and PA 191 heads northwest along East Sterling Road. The road passes through more dense forests, heading through the community of East Sterling. The route heads into Sterling Township and becomes Twin Rocks Road, continuing through rural areas and coming to an interchange with I-84. Following this interchange, PA 191 heads northwest through woodland with some commercial development before coming to an intersection with PA 196. At this point, PA 196 heads north for a concurrency with PA 191 on Easton Turnpike, continuing through rural areas and crossing the West Branch Wallenpaupack Creek into Salem Township. The road passes through a mix of farmland and woodland with some homes, coming to an intersection with PA 590 in the community of Hamlin among residential and commercial development. North of here, the two routes run through more farms and woods before PA 196 splits to the north and PA 191 continues northeast on Lake Ariel Highway. The road enters Lake Township and heads through wooded areas with some fields and homes, reaching the community of Lake Ariel. Here, the route passes west of Lake Ariel before it heads through residential areas and intersects the southern terminus of PA 296, turning to the east. PA 191 curves to the northeast and runs through forests with some farm fields and homes, continuing into Cherry Ridge Township. The road continues through rural land, passing through the community of Hoadleys. Farther northeast, the route crosses into Texas Township, where it makes a turn to the north.

PA 191 enters the borough of Honesdale and becomes Sunrise Avenue, passing a mix of residential and commercial development with some woodland. The route continues northwest onto Erie Street and runs past more development before it turns northeast onto 4th Street, crossing the Stourbridge Railroad and coming to an intersection with US 6. At this point, PA 191 becomes concurrent with US 6 and the route heads north on a one-way pair, with the northbound direction following westbound US 6 along Church Street and the southbound direction following eastbound US 6 along Main Street. The one-way pair, which carries two lanes in each direction, passes through the commercial downtown of Honesdale before passing through residential areas. After crossing the Lackawaxen River, US 6 splits to the west and both directions of PA 191 continue north on two-lane undivided Main Street, passing more homes. The road intersects the southern terminus of PA 670 and crosses Dyberry Creek, becoming Fair Avenue and passing residences and businesses to the east of the creek. The route leaves Honesdale for Dyberry Township and becomes Hancock Highway, passing east of the Wayne County Fairgrounds before running through forested areas. PA 191 winds north through rural land and passes through the community of Dyberry before bending north-northeast and crossing into Oregon Township. The road continues through forests with some farm fields, passing through the community of Siko before entering Lebanon Township. The route runs through more rural land and curves northeast, crossing PA 371 in the community of Rileyville.

PA 191 continues through forests with occasional farmland and homes and crosses into Damascus Township, where it makes a curve to the north and passes through the community of Hilltown. The road enters Manchester Township and passes through the community of Lookout before a curve to the north-northwest, heading through Priceville. The route continues through rural areas, turning west and then north. PA 191 heads north through dense forests and reaches the community of Equinunk, where it turns northwest and crosses the Equinunk Creek into Buckingham Township. At this point, the Delaware River begins to follow the road to the northeast as it continues northwest through forests. The route and the river curve to the west and then to the north, with the route passing through the community of Dillontown. PA 191 continues to wind north along the west bank of the Delaware River through forests, passing through Stockport. Farther north, the road turns northwest and reaches an intersection with the eastern terminus of PA 370. Following this, PA 191 curves northeast near homes and businesses and comes to its northern terminus at the New York border on the Hancock Bridge over the West Branch Delaware River, where the road continues as South Pennsylvania Avenue into the village of Hancock and provides access to NY 97.

History

In the 1920s and 1930s, the first PA 191 number was designated from US 1 (Baltimore Pike) in Clifton Heights to Penrose Avenue in southwest Philadelphia. The first state highway numbers to be assigned on the modern PA 191 were Pennsylvania Route 12 and Pennsylvania Route 90. The earliest alignment of PA 12 had nothing to do with what it would later become; it was originally designated onto the Baltimore Pike, which is now mostly US 1. In 1927, this highway was extended north to the New York line. From Philadelphia to Bethlehem, the highway followed modern-day PA 309 and PA 378. It then reached Stockertown via PA 191, and hit Saylorsburg via the Sullivan Trail. It then took Hamilton S to Sciota, then US 209 BUS and US 209 to the New York line at Milford. That year, PA 90 was designated from Stroudsburg to the New York-Pennsylvania border. From the 1920s to the 1940s, the designation between Stockertown and Stroudsburg had no signed traffic route.  In 1928, several spurs were commissioned. For PA 90, the following spurs were assigned in The Poconos region: PA 190, PA 290, PA 390, PA 490, PA 590, and PA 690. In 1928, For PA 12, the following spurs were assigned in The Poconos and Lehigh Valley regions: PA 212, PA 312, PA 412, PA 512, PA 612, and PA 712. Later that year, concurrencies with national highways were removed, truncating PA 12 to terminate at Center Valley and Saylorsburg; Hamilton S was apparently not retained as a state highway.

In April 1935, PA 12 was extended north to US 611 in Bartonsville, filling a gap between Snydersville and Bartonsville. By 1950, PA 90 was extended south to Easton, including the highway between Stroudsburg and Stockertown. On April 17, 1961, PA 191 was commissioned from the New York state line to US 309 in Center Valley. The route replaced PA 12 south of Stockertown (the rest would be superseded by the PA 33 freeway) and PA 90 north of Stockertown (the rest remained part of PA 115 until 1972). In Bethlehem, PA 191 was designated onto Wyandotte Street, crossed the Lehigh River, went onto Main Street, turned onto Elizabeth Avenue, and turned onto Linden Street or Nazareth-Bethlehem Pike north of the city. PA 191 was designated to replace PA 12 and PA 90 in order to provide a continuous route between Center Valley and the New York border as well as to reduce confusion with I-90 in the northwest part of the state.

By 1970, when PA 378 was commissioned, PA 191 moved designations slightly in Bethlehem. Southbound PA 191 came from Nazareth, as Linden Street, and in Bethlehem, it turned west onto Union Boulevard. After it passed underneath I-378, the route turned south onto 3rd Avenue then onto the I-378 freeway. I-378 terminated at the bridge that crosses the Lehigh River and it continued as PA 191 (Wyandotte Street). By 1976, PA 191 was truncated to end at its current location and PA 378 (formerly I-378) replaced its former routing from the Lehigh River bridge to PA 309 in Center Valley.

Major intersections

PA 191 Truck

Pennsylvania Route 191 Truck was a route that followed PA 248, PA 33, and the exit slip-ramps at the PA 33-PA 191 interchange. It was signed in 2014.  Signs were removed and PA 191 Truck was decommissioned in 2016.

See also

References

External links

Pennsylvania Highways: PA 191

191
Transportation in Monroe County, Pennsylvania
Transportation in Wayne County, Pennsylvania
Transportation in Pike County, Pennsylvania
Transportation in Northampton County, Pennsylvania